Grosvenor House may refer to:

Grosvenor House, a former building in Park Lane, London, UK
Grosvenor House Hotel, a hotel in Mayfair, London, UK
Grosvenor House (Dubai), a hotel in Dubai, UAE
E.O. Grosvenor House, a house museum in Jonesville, Michigan, USA
 Grosvenor House, a de Havilland DH.88 Comet aircraft which won the MacRobertson Air Race from the UK to Australia in 1934; the aircraft's owner was the manager of the Grosvenor House Hotel